Anthony de Jasay (15 October 1925 – 23 January 2019) was a Hungarian writer, economist, and right-libertarian philosopher. He studied in Székesfehérvár and Budapest, and obtained a degree in agriculture. He then worked as a freelance journalist, but emigrated from Hungary in 1948 after the Communist government nationalized his father's farm.

He spent two years in Austria, and then emigrated to Australia, where he took classes in economics at the University of Western Australia. Moving to England, de Jasay did research at Oxford University and Nuffield College until 1962. He finally settled in France and spent the rest of his career publishing articles for the Economic Journal and the Journal of Political Economy, among others.

The confiscation of his father's farm and the Solidarność movement in Poland in the 1980s inspired de Jasay to author his first book, The State (1985).

Anthony de Jasay died on 23 January 2019, aged 93 in France.

Works

References

1925 births
2019 deaths
People from Székesfehérvár
20th-century Hungarian male writers
21st-century Hungarian male writers
20th-century Hungarian philosophers
21st-century Hungarian philosophers
Hungarian expatriates in France
Hungarian expatriates in Australia
Hungarian libertarians
Member of the Mont Pelerin Society